The men's 200 metre butterfly competition of the swimming events at the 2015 Pan American Games took place on July 14 at the CIBC Pan Am/Parapan Am Aquatics Centre and Field House in Toronto, Canada. The defending Pan American Games champion was Leonardo de Deus of Brazil.

This race consisted of four lengths of the pool, all lengths in butterfly. The top eight swimmers from the heats would qualify for the A final (where the medals would be awarded), while the next best eight swimmers would qualify for the B final.

On July 16 it was reported that Mauricio Fiol oF Peru tested positive for stanozolol with the likely outcome of being stripped of his medal.  On July 23 the PASO issued a press release indicating that Fiol was disqualified and has to forfeit his medal.

Records
Prior to this competition, the existing world and Pan American Games records were as follows:

The following new records were set during this competition.

Qualification

Each National Olympic Committee (NOC) was able to enter up to two entrants providing they had met the A standard (2:01.39) in the qualifying period (January 1, 2014 to May 1, 2015). NOCs were also permitted to enter one athlete providing they had met the B standard (2:08.67) in the same qualifying period. All other competing athletes were entered as universality spots.

Results

Heats

The first round was held on July 14.

B Final 
The B final was also held on July 14.

A Final 
The A final was also held on July 14.

References

Swimming at the 2015 Pan American Games